Puya glabrescens is a species in the genus Puya. This species is endemic to Bolivia.

References

glabrescens
Flora of Bolivia